Lawrence's thrush (Turdus lawrencii) is a species of bird in the family Turdidae. It is found in Bolivia, Brazil, Colombia, Ecuador, Peru, and Venezuela. Described in 1878 by George N. Lawrence as Turdus brunneus, a name that was already in use (by Brewer, 1852 and used for Turdus rufescens) the species was therefore renamed as Turdus lawrencii by Elliott Coues in 1880. Its natural habitats are subtropical or tropical moist lowland forests and subtropical or tropical swamps.

References

Lawrence's thrush
Birds of the Amazon Basin
Birds of the Colombian Amazon
Birds of the Ecuadorian Amazon
Birds of the Peruvian Amazon
Birds of the Venezuelan Amazon
Lawrence's thrush
Taxonomy articles created by Polbot